Savage Warriors is a video game developed by French studio Atreid Concept and published by Mindscape for MS-DOS.

Gameplay
Savage Warriors is a two dimensional fighting game in which the characters have the ability to hang from items in the background.

Reception
Next Generation reviewed the PC version of the game, rating it three stars out of five, and stated that "if you're looking for 2D fighting on the PC, Savage Warriors is a very competent effort."

Reviews
PC Gamer (Oct, 1995)
Computer Gaming World (Oct, 1995)
PC Player (Germany) - Jul, 1995
PC Games - Jun, 1995

References

1995 video games
DOS games
DOS-only games
Fighting games
Mindscape games
Video games developed in France